Godiva Chocolatier is a Belgian-based international chocolate maker which is owned by Turkish conglomerate Yıldız Holding

Founded in 1926, it was purchased by Turkish Yıldız Holding in November 2007. In 2019, South Korean private equity firm MBK Partners purchased Tokyo-based Godiva Japan, as well as operations in South Korea and Oceania, for a deal valued at over US$1 billion. Godiva owns and operates more than 600 shops in the United States, Canada, Europe, and Asia and is available via over 10,000 speciality retailers.

In 2019, Godiva had planned to open 2,000 Cafés worldwide over the next 6 years, a concept that would introduce more coffee chain-type products including espresso drinks and croissant sandwiches. However, in January, 2021, Godiva announced it would close all its 128 brick-and-mortar locations across North America by the end of March 2021, due to the lockdowns and restrictions of the Covid-19 pandemic drastically reducing in-person shopping, but would maintain wholesale operations.

History
Godiva was founded in 1926 in Brussels, Belgium, by the Draps family, who opened their first shop in the Grand-Place in Brussels under its present name in honour of the legend of Lady Godiva. The first shop outside Belgium was opened in Paris on the Rue Saint Honoré in 1958. In 1966, the company's products reached the United States, where they were sold at shopping centres. The following year, Godiva was sold by the Draps Family to the Campbell Soup Company. In 1972, the first Godiva shop in North America was opened on New York City's Fifth Avenue. 
 

By 2007, Godiva had annual sales of approximately $500 million. In August of that year, the Campbell Soup Company announced it was exploring strategic alternatives, including possible divestiture, for its Godiva Chocolatier business; the company said the "premium chocolate business does not fit with Campbell's strategic focus on simple meals". In December 2007, Campbell announced that it entered into an agreement to sell Godiva to Yıldız Holding based in Istanbul, Turkey, which is the owner of Ülker group and the largest consumer goods manufacturer in Turkey. The acquisition was completed in March 2008 for $850 million.

Godiva continues to own and operate more than 450 shops worldwide.

In May 2012, Godiva opened Café Godiva in London's Harrods department store, which offers Godiva's chocolate beverages, pastries and chocolates. The company also has a store in the Harrods Food Hall.

In 2016, Godiva celebrated its 90th anniversary and opened its 100th store in China. In 2017, the business opened its first store in Australia, inaugurated its Pierre Draps Chocolate Research & Development Centre in Brussels and opened its North America flagship store at Rockefeller Center in Midtown Manhattan. In 2018, Godiva opened its first café in Brussels, the birthplace of the brand.

In Japan in February 2018, Godiva took out a full-page ad in the Nihon Keizai Shimbun financial newspaper, suggesting the retirement of the giri choco practice. As part of this practice, women are expected to buy chocolate for their colleagues, friends, bosses and sometimes family members on Valentine's Day. The public's reaction to the ad was generally seen as favorable.

As of October 2020, the CEO of Godiva is Nurtaç Ziyal Afridi.

Civic engagement
Godiva is committed to sustainability practices. The company is a participating member of the World Cocoa Foundation and Cocoa Horizons Foundation and a partner of Save the Children. Godiva began The Lady Godiva Program, which partnered with FEED Projects in its first year. Godiva also partners with the Earthworm Foundation to continue their commitment to ensuring the sustainability of the cocoa industry and is in agreement with the Cocoa & Forests Initiative to stop deforestation and forest degradation concerning the production of cocoa.

Godiva's sustainability efforts also impact people. With the Seeds for Progress Foundation, Godiva facilitates access to education for children living in coffee-growing communities. The Lady Godiva Initiative is Godiva's pledge to annually honor and award $25,000 grants to five non-governmental organizations (NGOs) in the US, Canada, Belgium, England and China that are doing the work of empowering women.

Locations 
In 2016, Godiva had approximately 650 retail stores throughout the world. Godiva's global presence increased rapidly, especially in such non-Western countries as China and Japan. In 2021, Godiva announced that it would close its 128 stores in North America because of decreased mall traffic sales; customers could instead purchase products through Godiva's online marketplace and through grocery, club, and retail partners.

Godiva has factories in Brussels, in Reading, Pennsylvania, and in Turkey.

Legal disputes 
Lawyers of the company have sent a series of letters warning the Lady Godiva public house in Geneva, Switzerland, that they are infringing upon their intellectual property, with the latest asking them to cease and desist from using the name. Pru Porretta, who was behind the revival of Dame Goodyver's Daye in Coventry, England, where a procession through the city's streets includes her representing Lady Godiva riding a horse commented "I think it's very sad. Godiva was a great woman who challenged her husband to stop the terrible things that were happening to the people. I'm sure Lady Godiva wouldn't care for a company which seems to be taking something that wasn't theirs originally and wants to use it for themselves and nobody else. It's about our rich heritage. I would say it's morally wrong".

Criticism
Godiva has been involved in the controversy over chocolate manufacturers' use of child labor in the production of cocoa.

Godiva's milk chocolate was found to be heavily contaminated with nickel in a laboratory test done by the German consumer institute Stiftung Warentest in 2018.

Godiva has also been found to be spreading misinformation, falsely claiming that their chocolates are exclusively made in Belgium.

Gallery

See also 

List of bean-to-bar chocolate manufacturers

References

Stiftung Warentest: Diese Schokolade schneidet am besten ab: https://www.rnd.de/wirtschaft/stiftung-warentest-diese-schokolade-schneidet-am-besten-ab-VTCK4CGY6JGPCSVQJP7LTKGR6U.html

External links
How Chemistry Landed a Chocolatier His Dream Job, 2019 WSJ video, 5min

Belgian chocolate companies
Food and drink companies based in Brussels
Retail companies established in 1926
Brand name chocolate
Yıldız Holding
Food and drink companies established in 1926
Belgian companies established in 1926
1967 mergers and acquisitions
2008 mergers and acquisitions